Morten H. Christiansen is a Danish cognitive scientist known for his work on the evolution of language, and connectionist modeling of human language acquisition. He is Professor in the Department of Psychology and Co-Director of the Cognitive Science Program at Cornell University as well Senior Scientist at the Haskins Labs and Professor in the School of Communication and Culture at Aarhus University. His research has produced evidence for considering language to be a cultural system that is shaped by general-purpose cognitive and learning mechanisms, rather than from innate language-specific mental structures.

Selected publications

 

 Christiansen, M.H. & Chater, N. (2016). Creating language: Integrating evolution, acquisition, and processing. Cambridge, MA: MIT Press. 
 Christiansen, M.H. & Chater, N. (2016). The Now-or-Never bottleneck: A fundamental constraint on language. Behavioral & Brain Sciences, 39, e62 [target article] 
 Richerson, P.J. & Christiansen, M.H. (Eds.) (2013).Cultural evolution: Society, technology, language and religion. Cambridge, MA: MIT Press.
 Christiansen, M.H. & Chater, N. (2008). Language as shaped by the brain. Behavioral & Brain Sciences, 31, 489-558. [target article]
 Christiansen, M.H., Collins, C. & Edelman, S. (Eds.) (2009). Language universals. New York: Oxford University Press.
 Christiansen, M.H. & Kirby, S. (Eds.) (2003). Language evolution. Oxford, U.K.: Oxford University Press. 
 Christiansen, M.H. & Chater, N. (Eds.) (2001). Connectionist psycholinguistics. Westport, CT: Ablex.

References

External Links 

 

Living people
Cornell University faculty
Alumni of the University of Edinburgh
Danish social scientists
Year of birth missing (living people)